All Over Me may refer to:

 All Over Me (film), a 1997 drama
 "All Over Me" (Josh Turner song), 2010
 "All Over Me" (Blake Shelton song), 2001
 "All Over Me" (Charlie Rich song), 1975
 "All Over Me" (Chocolate Starfish song), 1993
 "All Over Me", a 2002 song by Aphrodite
 "All Over Me", a song by David Byrne from Look into the Eyeball
 "Freakin' Out" / "All Over Me", a song by Graham Coxon
 "All Over Me", a song by Lisa Stansfield from The Complete Collection
 "All Over Me", a song by Drowning Pool from Sinner
 "All Over Me", a song by The Benjamin Gate